Bhaurao Dewaji Khobragade (25 September 1925 – 9 April 1984), commonly known as Rajabhau Khobragade, was an Indian barrister, Ambedkarite social activist and politician. He was a member of the Rajya Sabha of the Parliament of India at various times from 1958 to 1984. He was Deputy Chairman of the Rajya Sabha from 1969 to 1972. Khobragade was an Ambedkarite and leader of Republican Party of India (RPI). He hails from Mahar (Scheduled Caste) community and, in 1956 he got converted into Buddhism along with B. R. Ambedkar, the father of the Indian Constitution.

Khobragade had his early education at Jubilee High School, Chandrapur. He then went on to clear the Inter Science exam from Nagpur Science College in 1943 and B.A. exam from Morris College, Nagpur in 1945. On the advice of Dr. Babasaheb Ambedkar, he went to London to study law  in 1950. He was one of the 16 students Dr. Ambedkar sent to London to study but was an exception as he went to London bearing his own expenses and the rest were scholarship students.

The [All Indian Republican Party] (अखिल भारतीय रिपब्लिकन पक्ष)] is a political party in India, a splinter group of the Republican Party of India and named for its leader, B. D. Khobragade. Barrister Rajabhau Khobragade Grandson Rajas Khobragade leading his movement.

Honors 
Indian Post issued a stamp dedicated to Khobragade in 2009.

References

1925 births
1984 deaths
Marathi politicians
Republican Party of India politicians
Rajya Sabha members from Maharashtra
Deputy Chairman of the Rajya Sabha
Republican Party of India (Khobragade) politicians
Indian Buddhists
20th-century Buddhists
Social workers
Social workers from Maharashtra
British Buddhists
Converts to Buddhism from Hinduism
Buddhist activists
Dalit activists
Activists from Maharashtra
20th-century Indian lawyers
20th-century jurists
21st-century jurists
20th-century Indian politicians
Bombay State politicians